Donald D. Palmer is Emeritus Professor of Philosophy at the College of Marin in Kentfield, California. He is known for writing introductory books on philosophy and philosophers which attempt to make philosophical ideas accessible to novices.
He also illustrates his own books. Currently he is visiting assistant professor of philosophy at North Carolina State University in Raleigh, North Carolina.

Bibliography
 Looking At Philosophy: The Unbearable Heaviness of Philosophy Made Lighter (Mayfield Publications, 1988)
 Does the Center Hold? An Introduction to Western Philosophy (Mayfield Publications, 1991)
 Structuralism and Poststructuralism for Beginners (Writers and Readers, 1995)
 Sartre for Beginners (Writers and Readers, 1995)
 Kierkegaard for Beginners (Writers and Readers, 1996)
 Visions of Human Nature: An Introduction (Mayfield Publications, 2000)
 Why It's Hard to Be Good: An Introduction to Ethical Theory (McGraw-Hill, Summer 2005)

References

Living people
Philosophy academics
20th-century American philosophers
21st-century American philosophers
Historians of philosophy
College of Marin faculty
North Carolina State University faculty
Writers from the San Francisco Bay Area
Kierkegaard scholars
Sartre scholars
Year of birth missing (living people)